Ruslan Rafikovich Nasibulin (also spelled Rouslan Nassiboulline, born 2 March 1981 in Verkhoturye, Sverdlovsk Oblast) is a Russian fencer, who has won bronze Olympic medal in the team foil competition at the 2004 Summer Olympics in Athens.

References

External links
 Ruslan Rafikovich Nasibullin at the Russian Fencing Federation  (in English)
 
  (archive)
 
 

1981 births
Living people
Russian male fencers
Olympic fencers of Russia
Olympic bronze medalists for Russia
Olympic medalists in fencing
Fencers at the 2004 Summer Olympics
Medalists at the 2004 Summer Olympics
People from Sverdlovsk Oblast
Sportspeople from Sverdlovsk Oblast
21st-century Russian people